The Audie Awards (rhymes with "gaudy"; abbreviated from audiobook), or simply the Audies, are awards for achievement in spoken word, particularly audiobook narration and audiodrama performance, published in the United States of America. They are presented by the Audio Publishers Association (APA) annually in March.

The Audies are commonly likened to the Academy Awards for their public recognition of merit in the audio industry. In order to win, works must be submitted for nomination. A panel of judges considers candidates based on consumer acceptance, sales performance, and marketing, and winners and finalists are chosen based on narration, production quality, and source content; formerly packaging was also evaluated.

Awards
Twenty-five Audies are currently awarded by the Audio Publishers' Association. The APA presently categorizes the awards as follows:

Audiobook of the Year
 Audie Award for Audiobook of the Year

Narration
 Audie Award for Audio Drama
 Audie Award for Best Female Narrator
 Audie Award for Best Male Narrator
 Audie Award for Narration by the Author
 Audie Award for Multi-Voiced Performance

General
 Audie Award for Original Work
 Audie Award for Short Stories or Collection
 Audie Award for Autobiography or Memoir
 Audie Award for Business and Personal Development
 Audie Award for Faith-Based Fiction and Nonfiction
 Audie Award for Fantasy
 Audie Award for Fiction
 Audie Award for History or Biography
 Audie Award for Humor
 Audie Award for Literary Fiction or Classics
 Audie Award for Mystery
 Audie Award for Nonfiction
 Audie Award for Romance
 Audie Award for Science Fiction
 Audie Award for Thriller or Suspense
 Audie Award for Young Listeners' Title
 Audie Award for Middle Grade Title
 Audie Award for Young Adult Title
 Audie Award for Spanish Language Title

Numerous other awards have been discontinued or merged since the Audies' inception in 1996.

Special awards

Special Achievement

Judge's Award

Hall of Fame

Audie Awards galas
The Audie Awards gala is the annual awards ceremony during which most of the Audie Awards are presented. It is hosted by the Audio Publishers Association and features a guest master of ceremonies (emcee), usually a notable figure in the world of audiobook narration or a celebrity audiobook enthusiast.

The Audiobook of the Year award was not presented before 2004.

References

External links
The Audies official website
Past Winners - APA lists Audie Award winners from 1996 to the present

 
Audiobook awards
American literary awards
Awards established in 1996
1996 establishments in the United States